Julius Pruitt (born December 30, 1985) is a former American football wide receiver. He was signed by the Miami Dolphins as an undrafted free agent in 2009. He played college football at Ouachita Baptist University.

Professional career

Miami Dolphins
Pruitt was signed by the Miami Dolphins as an undrafted rookie free agent. He was waived by Miami Dolphins on September 3, 2011. In the 2011 NFL season he made a strong impact as a gunner, improving the special teams greatly late in the season. On July 31, 2013, Pruitt was signed again by the Miami Dolphins. He was cut by the Dolphins on August 27, 2013.

Arizona Rattlers
Pruitt was assigned to the Arizona Rattlers of the Arena Football League on October 21, 2013.

References

External links
Miami Dolphins bio

1985 births
Living people
People from Newport, Arkansas
Players of American football from Arkansas
Ouachita Baptist Tigers football players
American football wide receivers
Miami Dolphins players
Arizona Rattlers players